Muk or Mook in Iran may refer to:
 Muk, Fars
 Muk, South Khorasan